For articles related to Indian linguistics see:
 the languages of India, or more broadly, the languages of South Asia
 Vyākaraṇa, the ancient Indian school of grammar
 any of the other related Indian disciplines of Nirukta (etymology), Shiksha (phonetics and phonology), Chandas (meter)